The following lists events that happened during 1993 in Zaire.

Incumbents 
 President – Mobutu Sese Seko
 Prime Minister – Étienne Tshisekedi – Faustin Birindwa

Events

See also

 Zaire
 History of the Democratic Republic of the Congo

References

Sources

 
Zaire
Zaire